Silene armeria, commonly known as the Sweet William catchfly, is a species of plant in the family Caryophyllaceae. Originally a native of Europe, it has become widespread in the United States. Perennial in USDA plant hardiness zones 5 to 8. A small-growing form is known as dwarf catchfly. The name comes from the way in which small insects are trapped by the sticky sap exuded onto the stem.  However it is not currently regarded as a carnivorous plant, though it has been identified as a carnivorous plant in the past.

Description 

The plant between 20 and 70 cm in height. Leaves numerous 2.5–5 cm long, elliptic, oval, or narrowly oval, smooth. Blooming period in British Isles - Jun-Oct. Clusters of pink or lavender flowers arranged somewhat openly or compactly at end of stems. Stem hairless (glabrous) or slightly hairy with sticky areas, especially just below the cluster.

Habitat 
A plant native of Europe in roadsides, weedy places. Has been introduced to North America and later escaped cultivation to become an invasive species.

Synonyms 
WCSPF defines the following Silene armeria L. synonyms:

Atocion armeria (L.) Raf.
Atocion armeria var. lituanicum (Zapał.) Niketić & Stevan.
Atocion armeria var. sparsiflorum (Schur) Niketić & Stevan.
Atocion armeroides Raf.
Atocion lituanicum (Zapał.) Tzvelev
Cucubalus fasciculatus Lam.
Lychnis armoraria Scop. (Unresolved)
Silene armeria var. sparsiflora Schur (Unresolved)
Silene lituanica Zapał. (spelling variant S. lithuanica)
Silene umbellata Gilib. (Unresolved)

The source marks all these WCSPF synonym entries as "low confidence" and "awaiting review". Silene lituanica that has been described as species in 1911 was still considered species by Lithuanian botanists in 2009 and as such is included into the list of extinct and endangered species of Lithuania since 1962.

References

External links 

 theplantlist.org / Silene armeria L.
 aphotoflora.com / Silene armeria - Sweet William Catchfly (Caryophyllaceae Images)
 pbase.com / Sweet William Catchfly

armeria
Plants described in 1753
Taxa named by Carl Linnaeus